Mount Perseus is a mountain in British Columbia, Canada.

Mount Perseus is the highest peak within a mountainous area between Clearwater Lake (20 km to the southeast of Perseus) and Quesnel Lake (20 km to the northwest).

See also
 List of Ultras of North America

References

External links
 "Mount Perseus, British Columbia" on Peakbagger

Perseus
Cariboo Mountains
Cariboo Land District